Clapham Junction railway station is a major railway station and transport hub near St John's Hill in south-west Battersea in the London Borough of Wandsworth.

Routes from London's south and south-west termini, Victoria and Waterloo, funnel through the station, making it the busiest in Europe by number of trains using it: between 100 and 180 per hour except for the five hours after midnight. The station is also the busiest UK station for interchanges between services, and the only railway station in Great Britain with more interchanges than entries or exits.

History

The second line, initially from Nine Elms to Richmond, opened on 27 July 1846. Nine Elms was replaced in 1848 as the terminus by Waterloo Bridge station, now Waterloo. The line to Victoria opened by 1860. Clapham Junction opened on 2 March 1863, a joint venture of the L&SWR, the London, Brighton and South Coast Railway (LB&SCR) and the West London Extension Railway (WLER) as an interchange station for their lines.

The railway companies, to attract a middle- and upper-class clientele, seized the nonindustrial parish calculating that being upon the slopes of Clapham's plateau would only reinforce this distinction, leading to a long-lasting misunderstanding that the station is in Clapham.

Discontinued proposals
A  planning application from Metro Shopping Fund was withdrawn before governmental planning committee consideration on 20 May 2009.

A 'Heathrow Airtrack' to reduce the 95-minute journey by tube and Gatwick Express to Gatwick and unite the Great Western Main Line with Heathrow, Gatwick and the South West Main Line was cancelled in 2011 following improvements to the 2005-built Heathrow Connect track from Hayes and Harlington and practical impediments, such as pressure for continued high-frequency services on the three deemed-'entrenched' semi-fast and slow services between Clapham Junction and Staines.  Overground, the change would have been at Clapham Junction.

Incidents and accidents

Clapham rail disaster

On the morning of 12 December 1988, two collisions involving three commuter trains occurred slightly south west of the station due to a defective signal. Thirty-five people died and more than 100 were injured.

Track bombing
On the morning of 16 December 1991, a bomb ripped through tracks on one of the station's platforms, causing major disruption to the rail network. The Provisional Irish Republican Army (IRA) claimed responsibility.

The Junction

The station is named Clapham Junction because it is at the junction of several rail lines. The name is not given to any rail junction near the station which, without end-on intercompany junctions, are:

 Falcon Junction at the south end of the station, where the West London Line (WLL) joins the Brighton Slow Lines
 Ludgate Junction at the eastern end of the Windsor Line platforms to the WLL
 Latchmere SW Junction connecting the WLL to the Windsor lines at Ludgate Junction.
 Latchmere Main Junction connecting the WLL to the Brighton Line at Falcon Junction.
 West London Extension Junction and Junction for Waterloo, relaid for Eurostar empty-stock moves from the Windsor Lines to the WLL.
 Pouparts Junction where the low-level and high-level approaches to Victoria split.

The station today

Each day more than 2,000 trains, over half of them stopping, pass through the station, more than through any other station in Europe. At peak times up to 200 trains per hour pass through of which 122 stop. It is not the busiest station by number of passengers, most of whom (about 430,000 on a weekday, of which 135,000 are at rush hours) pass through. Interchanges make some 40% of the activity and on that basis too it is the busiest station in the UK.

In 2011 the station had three entrances, all with staffed ticket offices, though only the south-east entrance is open 24 hours a day.

The north entrance, which has restricted opening hours, leads from the Winstanley Estate on Grant Road to the same subway. The subway is crowded during rush hours, with the ticket barriers at the ends being pinch points.

The south-west entrance, also known as the Brighton Yard entrance, as the buildings still bear signage for the London, Brighton and South Coast Railway, has a more traditional appearance, with a Victorian station building set at the back of a large forecourt. This entrance leads to a very wide covered footbridge, which joins the western ends of all platforms. This entrance includes cycle parking and a taxi rank. It was re-opened in May 2011 as part of a wider programme of access improvements that included installing lifts to the platforms.

There are public and disabled toilets at the south-west entrance. There are refreshment kiosks in the subway, on the footbridge and on some platforms; and a small shopping centre, including a small branch of Sainsbury's supermarket, in the south-east entrance.

British Transport Police maintain a neighbourhood policing presence, whereas the Metropolitan Police Service and the part-Transport for London funded Safer Transport Command provides a police presence in the area outside the station.

On 9 December 2012 a new platform for the East London Line opened, creating an orbital railway around inner London.

Overcrowding is most frequent in the often convenient but narrow cross-platform subway. Using this rather than the wide, elegant flying concourse for interchange, a visitors' eyes assessment of fabric and environment listed Clapham Junction in the most needy 10% of Department for Transport category B stations.

Platforms

The station has seventeen platforms, numbered 1 to 17. In general, platforms 1 and 2 are used by London Overground trains, platforms 3–11 by South Western Railway trains, and platforms 12–17 by Southern trains. Non-stop Gatwick Express trains pass through platforms 12 and 13.
Usually, platform 1 is served by trains on the West London line, while platform 2 is used by services on the South London line, although this usage can be reversed.
 Platforms 3 and 4 are through platforms on the Waterloo–Reading line towards .
 Platforms 5 and 6 are through platforms on the Waterloo–Reading line towards .
 Platform 7 is a through platform located at a siding off the South West Main Line fast line towards , used by stopping trains.
 Platform 8 is a through platform on the South West Main Line fast line towards , used by non-stop trains passing through this station.
 Platform 9 is a through platform on the South West Main Line fast line towards .
 Platform 10 is a through platform on the South West Main Line slow line towards .
 Platform 11 is a through platform on the South West Main Line slow line towards .
 Platform 12 is a through platform on the Brighton Main Line fast line towards .
 Platform 13 is a through platform on the Brighton Main Line fast line towards .
 Platform 14 is a through platform on the Brighton Main Line slow line towards .
 Platform 15 is a through platform on the Brighton Main Line slow line towards .
 Platforms 16 and 17 are platforms connecting the Brighton Main Line slow line and the West London Line, used by Southern services. Platform 16 is the northbound platform (towards ) and platform 17 is the southbound platform (towards ). Platform 17 can also be used by some terminating London Overground services as well.
Sidings leading into railway sheds at the west of the station are located between platforms 6 and 7.

Because the platform gap is too wide at platform 8, it must not be used for stopping trains unless in an emergency.

Services
All South Western Railway services from Waterloo pass through the station, as do Southern and Gatwick Express trains from Victoria. The West London line and South London line services of London Overground have Clapham Junction as one of the termini.

The typical off-peak service of more than 120 trains an hour comprises:

South Western Railway:
35 tph to 
1 tph to 
1 tph to  via 
1 tph to 
1 tph to  via 
1 tph to 
2 tph to 
2 tph to  via 
2 tph to  via 
2 tph to  via 
2 tph to  via Surbiton
2 tph to  via 
2 tph to London Waterloo by the Kingston Loop via Wimbledon, Kingston and Richmond
2 tph to London Waterloo by the Hounslow Loop via Brentford, Hounslow and Richmond
2 tph to London Waterloo by the Hounslow Loop via Richmond, Hounslow and Brentford
2 tph to London Waterloo by the Kingston Loop via Richmond, Kingston and Wimbledon
2 tph to  via 
2 tph to  via Brentford, Hounslow and 
2 tph to 

Southern:
18 tph to 
2 tph to 
2 tph to  via 
2 tph to Eastbourne, with 1 continung to Ore
2 tph to 
2 tph to  via  and Epsom, of which one continues to Horsham
2 tph to 
2 tph to London Bridge via Crystal Palace
2 tph to 
1 tph to  via 
1 tph to  via 

London Overground:
4 tph to  via Canada Water
4 tph to  via Highbury & Islington

During peak hours on weekdays express services on the South West Main Line and outer suburban services to Alton and Basingstoke typically do not stop at the station.

Future proposals
In the 2010s, a Clapham Junction station was proposed as part of the Crossrail 2 project. A large underground station dug underneath the existing station was proposed to serve Crossrail 2 service. Due to the COVID-19 pandemic, the project was indefinitely postponed in 2020, although the route has been safeguarded.

The Northern line extension to Battersea Power Station was criticised for not extending to Clapham Junction. During the public inquiry into the extension in 2014, it was noted that although an extension to Clapham would be desirable, it was unnecessary to meet the needs of the Vauxhall Nine Elms Battersea regeneration area. Additionally, it was noted that a further extension could overwhelm the extension, due to the high demand. However, provision has been made for a future extension of the line to the station, with a reserved course underneath Battersea Park.

Government and Network Rail funding for in the early 2010s of £50 million of improvements was granted. This comprised an upgrade to the main interchange: new entrances and more retail.

In a Network Rail study in 2015, it was proposed that platform 0 could reopen for 8-car operations of the West London Line.

Connections
London Buses routes 35, 37, 39, 49, 77, 87, 156, 170, 219, 295, 319, 337, 344, 345, 639, 670, C3 and G1 and night routes N19, N31, N35 and N87 serve the station.

Notes and references

Notes

References

External links

Network Rail Details
Short History of Clapham Junction prepared by Wandsworth Council, and from which much of the information in the history section of this entry is sourced
1988: 35 dead in Clapham rail collision BBC News report on the 1988 train collisions
Local news website
Yes, Clapham Junction is that bad. The sun shone, but the roof still leaks, Zoe Williams, The Guardian 18 November 2009
 , description of the station in the 1930s

Network Rail managed stations
Railway stations in the London Borough of Wandsworth
Railway stations in Great Britain opened in 1863
Former London and South Western Railway stations
Former London, Brighton and South Coast Railway stations
Railway stations served by London Overground
Railway stations served by Govia Thameslink Railway
Railway stations served by South Western Railway
Rail junctions in London
Battersea